Giovanni Francesco Crivelli (20 September 1690 in Venice – 20 September 1743) was a Venetian priest. Crivelli was a priest member of the Somasco holy order in the Cloister of the Health, before becoming provincial Father of the order and rector of the Seminar of Murano.

Writings
He published two teaching books, the Elements of Numeral and Literal Arithmetic (published in Venice in 1728), and the Elements of Physics (published in Venice in 1731 and subsequently broadened in 1744).  His original manuscripts are lost.

The second book is particularly important for a number of reasons. It is a popular teaching book whose first volume contains material still used today in High School science classes (with the exception of electro-magnetic phenomena, considered at that time as little more than a novelty phenomenon). The book also discusses astronomical matters. The book notes the full reception of the physics of Galileo and of Newton with Galileo called "the prince of the scientists", and a full recognition of the importance of the Arabic Muslim civilisation in the creation of the scientific method.  The explanation of the scientific method coincides practically with the positions of neopositivism and of scientific realism.  The writing style is innovative and still relevant for its use of the Italian language, for the detailed and precise descriptions of many experiments, including those carried out outside Europe, and for demonstrating the varied hypotheses of scientists related to arguments under discussion in those years. Also of note is the recognition of the existence of theoretical physics, and its equal importance alongside experimental physics.

His activity was also highly valued outside of Italy. Crivelli was elected in January 1734 as a Fellow of the Royal Society (his books are in the library of the Royal Society). After his death, he was soon forgotten and his work was only recently re-discovered.

1743 deaths
1691 births
Republic of Venice clergy
Republic of Venice scientists
Fellows of the Royal Society